Forbes Creek is a locality in Queanbeyan-Palerang Regional Council, New South Wales, Australia. The town lies 45 km east of Canberra. The Tallaganda National Park includes part of its eastern edge.

References

Localities in New South Wales
Queanbeyan–Palerang Regional Council